Cathleen Galgiani (born January 4, 1964) is an American politician who served in the California State Senate. A Democrat, she represented the 5th Senate District, which encompasses San Joaquin County, and portions of Stanislaus and Sacramento counties.

Galgiani was a member of the California Legislative LGBT Caucus. Prior to her election to the State Senate in 2012, she served in the California State Assembly, representing the 17th Assembly District. Before her service as an elected official, she was the Chief of Staff to her predecessor, Assemblymember Barbara Matthews.

Biography
Galgiani attended San Joaquin Delta College before receiving her Bachelor's degree from California State University, Sacramento. Prior to working in the Legislature, Galgiani spent eight years as a physical therapy aide at San Joaquin General Hospital and Dameron Hospital in San Joaquin County.

Galgiani served as the consultant to the legislative committee on the development of University of California, Merced. She helped secure funding and support for UC Merced to ensure that the university continues to grow as the tenth campus in the University of California system. Galgiani also served as staffer for Pat Johnston, John Garamendi, and Barbara Matthews.

In a 2011 interview with the Stockton Record, Galgiani publicly disclosed that she is gay. In so doing, she became the eighth openly LGBT currently-serving member of the California Legislature, alongside Speaker Toni Atkins (D–San Diego), Assemblymembers Sabrina Cervantes (D–Riverside), Susan Eggman (D–Stockton), Todd Gloria (D–San Diego) and Evan Low (D–Campbell), as well as Senators Ricardo Lara (D–Bell Gardens) and Scott Wiener (D–San Francisco).

Galgiani was first elected to the State Senate after narrowly defeating Republican Assemblyman Bill Berryhill on November 6, 2012. In 2016, she won a second term, defeating Lodi Mayor Alan Nakanishi.

In 2018 Galgiani ran for the California Board of Equalization, to represent the 2nd district, but finished in 3rd place in the primaries, 1.2 point behind second place, which eliminated her from the general election.

References

External links
 
 Campaign website
 
 Join California Cathleen Galgiani

Democratic Party California state senators
1964 births
Living people
American people of Italian descent
San Joaquin Delta College alumni
California State University, Sacramento alumni
Democratic Party members of the California State Assembly
Women state legislators in California
LGBT state legislators in California
Lesbian politicians
21st-century American politicians
21st-century American women politicians
21st-century LGBT people